Amsinckia douglasiana is an uncommon species of fiddleneck known by the common name Douglas' fiddleneck. It is endemic to the coastal Santa Monica Mountains and Santa Ynez Mountains of southern California.

Description
Amsinckia douglasiana is a bristly annual herb producing coiled, fiddlehead-shaped inflorescences of yellow-orange flowers similar to other fiddlenecks. The flowers are over a centimeter wide and often have fewer than five lobes. This species is heterostylous.

It is also known as an occasional introduced species on the East Coast of the U.S.

Gallery

References

External links
Jepson Manual Treatment - Amsinckia douglasiana
Amsinckia douglasiana - Photo gallery

douglasiana
Endemic flora of California
Natural history of the California chaparral and woodlands
Natural history of the California Coast Ranges
Natural history of the Santa Monica Mountains
Natural history of the Transverse Ranges
•
Plants described in 1846